The Best of Tevin Campbell is a greatest hits album for R&B singer Tevin Campbell, released in 2001 by Qwest Records.

Track listing
 Can We Talk – 4:44
 I'm Ready – 4:45
 Shhh – 4:54
 Always in My Heart – 5:38
 Back to the World – 4:59
 Could You Learn to Love – 4:08
 Goodbye – 4:16
 Round and Round (Soul Mix Edit) – 4:54
 Tell Me What You Want Me to Do – 5:02
 One Song – 4:25
 Another Way – 4:54
 Don't Say Goodbye Girl – 4:30
 What Do I Say – 4:55 
 Brown Eyed Girl – 4:01 
 Tell Me Where – 4:28

References

2001 greatest hits albums
Albums produced by Narada Michael Walden
Qwest Records albums
Tevin Campbell albums
Warner Records compilation albums